Sean Treacy's GAA is a Tipperary GAA club which is located in County Tipperary, Ireland. Both hurling and Gaelic football are played in the "West-Tipperary" divisional competitions. The club is centred on the parish of Hollyford, Kilcommon and Rearcross in the Slieve Felim Hills, west of Thurles. and close to the county boundary with Limerick. The Club is named after 1920s IRA member, Seán Treacy.

Achievements
 West Tipperary Senior Hurling Championship (7) 1968, 1973, 1974, 1977, 1978, 1979, 1982
Tipperary Intermediate Hurling Championship (1) 2019
 West Tipperary Intermediate Hurling Championship (3)  2003, 2016, 2018
 West Tipperary Crosco Cup Hurling  (4) 1973,1974,1978,2022
 West Tipperary Junior A Football Championship (5) 2011, 2012, 2016, 2019, 2022
 West Tipperary Junior B Football Championship (3) 1998, 2005, 2009
 Tipperary Junior A Hurling Championship (1) 1966
 West Tipperary Junior A Hurling Championship (4) 1966, 1972, 2000, 2001
 West Tipperary Junior 2 Hurling Championship (2)1974, 1977
 Tipperary Under-21 B Football Championship (1) 1999
 West Tipperary Under-21 B Football Championship (1) 1999
 Tipperary Under-21 C Football Championship (1) 2008
 West Tipperary Under-21 C Football Championship (2) 2007, 2008
 West Tipperary Under-21 A Hurling Championship (3) 1970, 2015 (with Cappawhite), 2016 (with Cappawhite)
 Tipperary County Under-21 B Hurling Championship (1) 1990 (with Aherlow)
 West Tipperary Under-21 B Hurling Championship (5) 1989, 1990 (with Aherlow), 1997, 2014 (with Cappawhite),2019 [with Emly]
 Tipperary Under-21 C Hurling Championship (1) 2008
 West Tipperary Under-21 C Hurling Championship (1) 2007
 West Tipperary Under-19 B Hurling Championship (1) 2021 {with Eire Og}
 West Tipperary Minor C Football Championship (1) 2001
 West Tipperary Minor A Hurling Championship (Hollyford / Kilcommon / Glengar under the name Seán Treacys) (1) 1942 
 West Tipperary Minor B Hurling Championship (3) 2005, 2013(with Emly), 2014(with Emly)
 West Tipperary Minor B Shield championship  (1) 2020(with Emly)
 Tipperary Minor C Hurling Championship (1) 2003
 West Tipperary Minor C Hurling Championship (2) 2001, 2003

Notable players

 John Carey

References

External links 
GAA Info Profile
Tipperary GAA site

Gaelic games clubs in County Tipperary